Rethera is a genus of moths in the family Sphingidae first described by Walter Rothschild and Karl Jordan in 1903.

Species
Rethera afghanistana Daniel 1958
Rethera amseli Daniel 1958
Rethera brandti O Bang-haas 1937
Rethera komarovi (Christoph 1885)

References

Macroglossini
Moth genera
Taxa named by Walter Rothschild
Taxa named by Karl Jordan